The 1927 Connecticut Aggies football team represented Connecticut Agricultural College, now the University of Connecticut, in the 1927 college football season.  The Aggies were led by fifth year head coach Sumner Dole, and completed the season with a record of 5–4.

Schedule

References

Connecticut
UConn Huskies football seasons
Connecticut Aggies football